This is a list of urban parishes in Guayaquil:

Ayacucho
Bolívar
Carbo
Chongón
Febres Cordero
García Moreno
Letamendi
Nueve de Octubre
Pascuales
Olmedo
Roca
Rocafuerte
Sucre
Tarqui
Urdesa
Ximena

Guayaquil
Guayaquil
Parishes of Ecuador